The Mayor of Ashburton officiates over the Ashburton District of New Zealand's South Island. The district is administered by a district council. From 1878 until the 1989 local government reforms, the area was administered by a borough council. Neil Brown is the current mayor of Ashburton; he was elected in the 2019 local elections.

History
The Ashburton Borough Council was inaugurated in 1878. The first mayor was Thomas Bullock, who was elected on 2 September 1878. Nine borough councillors were elected on 5 September and the first council meeting was held on 9 September. Hugo Friedlander was the second mayor when he resigned in July 1892 as he had urgent business in England to attend to. Henry Davis was declared elected unopposed for 12 years in a row. The first time he had an opponent, in April 1915, he was defeated.

Methven farmer Angus McKay was mayor for two terms from the 2010 local elections to 2016. Donna Favel was the mayor of Ashburton between 2016 and 2019. Since 2019, the current mayor has been Neil Brown; he was sworn in on 24 October.

List of mayors of Ashburton

References

Ashburton
Ashburton
Ashburton District